Khayyr (Xayır) is a rural locality (a selo), the only inhabited locality, and the administrative center of Omoloysky National Rural Okrug of Ust-Yansky District in the Sakha Republic, Russia, located  from Deputatsky, the administrative center of the district. Its population as of the 2010 Census was 433, of whom 223 were male and 210 female, down from 441 recorded during the 2002 Census.

Geography 
The village is located in the Yana-Indigirka Lowland, on the right bank of the Omoloy.

See also 
 Lake Khaiyr

References

Sources
Official website of the Sakha Republic. Registry of the Administrative-Territorial Divisions of the Sakha Republic. Ust-Yansky District. 

Rural localities in Ust-Yansky District
Omoloy basin